Carex sparganioides, known as bur-reed sedge or loose-headed bracted sedge, is a perennial plant belonging to the sedge family (Cyperaceae). Its native range includes most of the eastern and central United States and eastern Canada. In Maine, it is typically found in hardwood or mixed forests.

Carex sparganioides is considered endangered in Maine and New Hampshire. It is used for soil stabilization on shaded slopes.

References

sparganioides
Plants described in 1805
Flora of Canada
Flora of the Eastern United States